Mastigella is an amoeboid genus belonging to Amoebozoa.

References

Amoebozoa genera
Conosa